In music, a major seventh chord is a seventh chord in which the third is a major third above the root and the seventh is a major seventh above the root. The major seventh chord, sometimes also called a Delta chord, can be written as maj7, M7, ⑦, etc. The "7" doesn't have to be superscripted, but if it is, then any alterations, added tones, or omissions are usually also superscripted. For example, the major seventh chord built on C, commonly written as Cmaj7, has pitches C–E–G–B:

It can be represented by the integer notation {0, 4, 7, 11}.

According to Forte, the major seventh chord is exemplified by IV7, which originates melodically.

The just major seventh chord is tuned in the ratios 8:10:12:15, as a just major chord is tuned 4:5:6 and a just major seventh is tuned 15:8.

The minor-minor sixth chord (minor triad with an added minor sixth) is an inversion of this chord.

Examples 
In 1888, the French composer Erik Satie composed three slow waltzes, entitled Gymnopédies. The first and best-known of these alternates two major seventh chords. The first eight measures (shown below) alternate between Gmaj7 and Dmaj7.

Later examples of tonic major seventh chords include Henry Mancini's Theme from Charlie's Angels, Joseph Kosma's "Autumn Leaves", The Beatles' "This Boy", Eagles' "One of These Nights", Bread's "Make It With You", America's "Tin Man", Blood Sweat & Tears' "You've Made Me So Very Happy", the third (main) part of Paul McCartney and Wings' "Band On The Run", Carly Simon's "The Right Thing to Do", and Chicago's "Colour My World".

Common in jazz since the Jazz Age of the 1920s, major seventh chords appeared frequently in compositions of genres influenced by jazz in the subsequent decades, such as traditional pop, bossa nova, and easy listening. Moving into the 1970s to replace the prominence of the dominant seventh chord as a stable tonic more common in the first fifteen years of the rock era, the major seventh was common in all styles, "pervading soul, country rock, soft rock, MOR (middle-of-the-road styles), jazz rock, funk, and disco." Music theorist Ken Stephenson continues:

Pieces which feature prominent major seventh chords include: Tadd Dameron's "Lady Bird", and "This Guy's in Love with You",  by Burt Bacharach and Hal David.

Major seventh chord table

{|class="wikitable"
!Chord
!Root
!Major third
!Perfect fifth
!Major seventh
|-
!Cmaj7
|C
|E
|G
|B
|-
!Cmaj7
|C
|E (F)
|G
|B (C)
|-
!Dmaj7
|D
|F
|A
|C
|-
!Dmaj7
|D
|F
|A
|C
|-
!Dmaj7
|D
|F (G)
|A
|C (D)
|-
!Emaj7
|E
|G
|B
|D
|-
!Emaj7
|E
|G
|B
|D
|-
!Fmaj7
|F
|A
|C
|E
|-
!Fmaj7
|F
|A
|C
|E (F)
|-
!Gmaj7
|G
|B
|D
|F
|-
!Gmaj7
|G
|B
|D
|F
|-
!Gmaj7
|G
|B (C)
|D
|F (G)
|-
!Amaj7
|A
|C
|E
|G
|-
!Amaj7
|A
|C
|E
|G
|-
!Amaj7
|A
|C (D)
|E (F)
|G (A)
|-
!Bmaj7
|B
|D
|F
|A
|-
!Bmaj7
|B
|D
|F
|A
|}

Major seventh chords for guitar

In standard tuning, the left is the low E string. To the right of the | is another way of playing the same chord. x means mute the string. (The Amaj7 demonstrates the movable chord shapes.)

 Amaj7: xx7654 | xxx224 | xx7999 | x02120 | 576655
 Bmaj7: x24342 | 7988xx
 Cmaj7: x35453 | x32000
 Dmaj7: xx0222 | x57675
 Emaj7: xx2444 | 021100
 Fmaj7: xx3555 | 103210 | xx3210
 Gmaj7: xx5777 | 320002

See also
Subtonic

References

Seventh chords

ca:Acord de sèptima#Acord de sèptima major